The Diocese of Gibraltar in Europe, known simply as the Diocese in Europe, is a diocese of the Church of England. It was originally formed in 1842 as the Diocese of Gibraltar. It is geographically the largest diocese of the Church of England and the largest diocese in the Anglican Communion, covering some one-sixth of the Earth's landmass. Its jurisdiction includes all of Europe (excluding the British Isles), Morocco, Turkey, Mongolia and the territory of the former Soviet Union.

The diocese is attached to the Church of England Province of Canterbury and is headed by the Bishop in Europe, who is assisted by the Suffragan Bishop in Europe. The present bishop, Robert Innes, was commissioned and consecrated on 20 July 2014, and the current suffragan bishop is David Hamid, who was consecrated bishop on 17 October 2002.

The see cathedral is the Cathedral of the Holy Trinity, Gibraltar and there are two pro-cathedrals, St Paul's Pro-Cathedral, Valletta, Malta, and the Pro-Cathedral of the Holy Trinity, Brussels, Belgium. The diocese is divided into seven archdeaconries.

History

Church of England churches and congregations were established in Continental European countries before the Reformation. In 1633 overseas churches of the Church of England were placed under the jurisdiction of the Bishop of London. In 1824, the British Foreign Secretary, George Canning, appointed Matthew Luscombe chaplain to the British embassy in Paris and to supervise all Church of England clergy on the continent. Unable to secure the support of the English bishops, Luscombe was consecrated a missionary bishop (i.e. without a See) by the Scottish bishops in 1825, and functioned as a sort of proto-Bishop of Fulham.

The Diocese of Gibraltar was created on 29 September 1842 and at that time covered all Anglican chaplaincies from Portugal to the Caspian Sea. In 1842 (shortly after the See's erection), her jurisdiction was described as "Gibraltar, and the Congregations of the Church of England in the Islands and on the Coasts of the Mediterranean"; a map from the same year shows churches at Lisbon, Oporto, Gibraltar, Malaga, Marseille, Nice, Tunis, Lucca, Leghorn, Florence, Rome, Palermo, Trieste, Valetta (sic), Messina, Naples, Corfu, Zante, Athens, Syra, Smyrna, and Constantinople. From 1926, Church of England parishes in northern Europe became part of the Jurisdiction of North and Central Europe, under the episcopal jurisdiction of the Bishop of London, delegated to the Suffragan Bishop of Fulham.

In 1970, John Satterthwaite was appointed as both Bishop of Fulham and Bishop of Gibraltar, and on 30 June 1980, the Gibraltar Diocese was officially amalgamated with the Jurisdiction of North and Central Europe. The new united diocese was renamed as the Diocese of Gibraltar in Europe and brought under the authority of the Bishop of Gibraltar in Europe.
 It has since become commonly known as the Diocese in Europe.

Archdeaconries

Eastern Archdeaconry, consisting of: Albania, Armenia, Austria, Azerbaijan, Belarus, Bosnia and Herzegovina, Bulgaria, Croatia, Czech Republic, Georgia, Greece, Hungary, Kosovo, Moldova, Mongolia, Montenegro, North Macedonia, Poland, Romania, Russia, Serbia, Slovakia, Slovenia, Turkey, Turkmenistan, Ukraine, and Uzbekistan. The previous archdeacon was Patrick Curran, who was based in Vienna, Austria and served 2002–2015. The archdeacon is assisted by two area deans (one in Greater Athens, Greece and one in Moscow, Russia). Colin Williams was full-time archdeacon 2015–2019, taking charge of both the Eastern archdeaconry and that of Germany and Northern Europe, and being based in Frankfurt, Germany; Leslie Nathaniel is Williams' successor full-time in both roles.
Archdeaconry of Germany and Northern Europe, consisting of: Denmark, Estonia, Finland, Germany, Iceland, Latvia, Lithuania, Norway, and Sweden. The archdeacon is assisted by two area deans; Nathaniel is also Archdeacon of Germany and Northern Europe.
Archdeaconry of France (including Monaco). The archdeacon is Peter Hooper (2021) who is assisted by three area deans.
Archdeaconry of Gibraltar, consisting of: Andorra, Gibraltar, Morocco, Portugal, and Spain. The archdeacon is David Waller; the archdeacon is assisted by two area deans.
Archdeaconry of Italy and Malta. The archdeacon is David Waller. The previous archdeacon was based in Milan, Italy and assisted by one area dean. In Italy the Archdeaconry operates through the association Chiesa d'Inghiltera, that in 2021 has signed an 'agreement' (Intesa) with the Italian Republic. 
Archdeaconry of North West Europe, consisting of: Belgium, Luxembourg, and the Netherlands. The archdeacon is Sam Van Leer (2021). The archdeacon is assisted by two area deans.
Archdeaconry of Switzerland. The archdeacon is Peter Hooper (2022).

Bishops
The diocese is led by the diocesan Bishop in Europe, Robert Innes, and the Suffragan Bishop in Europe, David Hamid. Norman Banks, Bishop of Richborough, provides alternative episcopal oversight for those chaplaincies which reject the priestly and episcopal ministry of women and of men who have ordained women.

The diocese also licences many honorary assistant bishops to fulfill some episcopal duties across the European diocese. Several of these are the current bishops of other churches in Europe in communion with the Church of England:
Mark Eddington has been the bishop-in-charge of the Convocation of Episcopal Churches in Europe since 2019. He lives in Paris, France.
Matthias Ring has been the bishop of the Catholic Diocese of the Old Catholics in Germany since 2010; the diocese is based in Bonn, Germany.
Jorge de Pina Cabral has been the diocesan bishop of the Lusitanian Church since 2012; the diocese is based in Gaia, Portugal.
Harald Rein has been bishop of the Christian Catholic Church of Switzerland since 2009.

The rest are retired Anglican bishops resident in England. The following are licensed  according to the official diocesan website:
2001–present: Richard Garrard, retired Director of the Anglican Centre in Rome and Archbishop's Representative to the Holy See and former Bishop of Penrith, lives in Upper Stoke, Norfolk and is also licensed in the Diocese of Norwich.
2002–present: Edward Holland, retired Bishop of Colchester, lives in Hammersmith, Greater London and is licensed in the Diocese of London.
2002–present: David Smith, retired Bishop of Bradford, lives in Dunnington, North Yorkshire and is also licensed in York diocese.
2003–present: John Flack, retired director of the Anglican Centre in Rome and Archbishop's Representative to the Holy See and former Bishop of Huntingdon, lives in Whittlesey, Cambridgeshire.
2003–present: A retired former Bishop of Durham and Bishop of Rochester, Michael Turnbull, lives in Sandwich, Kent.
2011–present: retired Bishop of Salisbury David Stancliffe lives in Stanhope, County Durham (he is also licensed in Durham diocese.)
2011–present: Stephen Venner, retired Bishop of Dover, current Bishop for the Falkland Islands and Bishop to the Forces, lives in St Albans, Hertfordshire and is also licensed in the Diocese of Rochester.
2013–present: retired Bishop of Blackburn Nicholas Reade lives in Bexhill, East Sussex.
2014–present: Michael Colclough, retired Canon Pastor of St Paul's Cathedral and former Bishop of Kensington, lives in Chelsea, Greater London, and is also licensed in the Diocese of London.
19 October 2016present: Martin Wharton, retired Bishop of Newcastle
18 October 2017present: Richard Chartres, retired Bishop of London
22 November 2018present: Michael Langrish, retired Bishop of Exeter
16 January 2020present: Trevor Willmott, retired Bishop of Dover

Additionally, there were several more honorary assistant bishops listed Crockford's Clerical Directory :
Fernando da Luz Soares, retired bishop of the Lusitanian church, is listed as having been licensed since 1995; he retired in 2013 but remains bishop emeritus of that church and apparently remains in Gaia, Portugal.

Churches and clergy 
The diocese currently has 131 clergy occupying stipendiary or full-time posts. However, not every member of the clergy receives a stipend in the same way as clergy in the United Kingdom. Many ministers are entirely supported by their own congregation.

Last fully updated 19 September 2018.

Archdeaconry of France

Archdeaconry of North West Europe

Archdeaconry of Germany and Northern Europe

Archdeaconry of Switzerland

Archdeaconry of Gibraltar

Archdeaconry of Italy and Malta

Eastern Archdeaconry

See also

Convocation of Episcopal Churches in Europe - an Anglican jurisdiction in Europe representing the Episcopal Church in the United States of America 
Catholic Diocese of the Old Catholics in Germany – Old Catholic church in Germany
Lusitanian Catholic Apostolic Evangelical Church - Anglican church in Portugal
Spanish Reformed Episcopal Church - Anglican church in Spain

References

External links

Diocese in Europe website

Weblog of the Suffragan Bishop in Europe
Diocese in Europe on the Anglican Communion website

 
Religious organizations established in 1842
Anglicanism in Gibraltar